TPS Star was a French general entertainment channel broadcasting movies, sports and sitcoms. It started broadcasting in 1996 as the flagship general channel of the newly launched TPS satellite platform, competing with Canal+ of the CanalSat platform. It started broadcasting in the TNT digital terrestrial television platform on 3 November 2005 as a pay channel with certain slots broadcast free-to-air. After the merger between TPS and CanalSat in 2007, it also became available on CanalSat. The channel has shut down on 4 May 2012.

External links
 

Defunct television channels in France
Television channels and stations established in 2001
Television channels and stations disestablished in 2012
2001 establishments in France
2012 disestablishments in France
Mass media in Paris